Chalon – Champforgeuil Airfield is an airfield located at Champforgeuil,  north-northwest of Chalon-sur-Saône, both communes of the Saône-et-Loire department in the Burgundy (Bourgogne) region of France.

Facilities
It has one asphalt paved runways designated 17/35 which measures .

References

External links 
 

Airports in Bourgogne-Franche-Comté
Buildings and structures in Saône-et-Loire
Airports established in 1935